John Finch may refer to: 

 John Finch (martyr) (1548–1584), English Roman Catholic farmer
 John Finch (MP for Winchelsea) (died 1642)
 John Finch, 1st Baron Finch (1584–1660), Speaker of the House of Commons, 1628–1629
 John Finch (ambassador) (1626–1682), ambassador of England to the Ottoman Empire
 John Finch, 6th Earl of Winchilsea (1682/83–1729), English peer
 John Finch (died 1740) (1689–1740), MP for Maidstone 1722–1740
 John Finch (died 1763) (c. 1692–1763), MP for Higham Ferrers 1724–1741 and Rutland 1741–1747
 John Thomas Finch (1930–2017), British structural biologist
 John A. Finch (1852–1915), English businessman
 John B. Finch (1852–1887), American politician and educator, chairman of the Prohibition Party
 John C. Finch (18??-1899), American member of the Four Hundred
 John W. Finch (1873–1951), American mining engineer

See also
 Jon Finch (1942 – 2012), English actor
 Finch (surname)